The 1974 United States Senate election in Washington was held on November 5, 1974. Incumbent Democratic U.S. Senator Warren Magnuson won a sixth term in office, defeating Republican state senator Jack Metcalf, in a rematch of the previous election.

Blanket primary
The blanket primary was held on September 17, 1974.

Candidates

Democratic
Warren G. Magnuson, incumbent United States Senator
John "Hugo Frye" Patric, writer

Republican
Jesse Chiang
Donald C. Knutson
James H. Liedke
Jack Metcalf, State Senator
June Riggs
Richard E. Van Horn

Results

Candidates

Democratic 
 Warren Magnuson, incumbent U.S. Senator

Republican 
 Jack Metcalf, State Senator

Results

See also 
 1974 United States Senate elections

References 

1974
1974 Washington (state) elections
Washington